Colm Mulcahy (born September 1958) is an Irish mathematician, academic, columnist, book author, public outreach speaker, and amateur magician. He is Professor Emeritus at Spelman College, where he was on the faculty from 1988 to 2020. In addition to algebra, number theory, and geometry, his interests include mathemagical card magic and the culture of mathematics–particularly the contributions of Irish mathematicians and also the works of iconic mathematics writer Martin Gardner. He has blogged for the Mathematical Association of America, The Huffington Post, Scientific American, and (aperiodically) for The Aperiodical; his puzzles have been featured in The New York Times. Mulcahy serves on the Advisory Council of the Museum of Mathematics in New York City. As of January 2021, he is Chair of Gathering 4 Gardner, Inc. He is the creator and curator of the Annals of Irish Mathematics and Mathematicians.

Education and career
Mulcahy got his BSc and MSc in mathematical science at University College Dublin in 1978 and 1979, and a PhD from Cornell University in 1985 where his advisor was Alex F. T. W. Rosenberg. From 1988 to 2020, he taught mathematics at Spelman College, in Atlanta, Georgia, and is now Professor Emeritus.  He served as chair of the department there from 2003 to 2006 and recently created the Archive of Spelman Mathematicians. In 1997 he received the MAA's Allendoerfer Award for excellence in expository writing for a paper on the basics of wavelet image compression. In 2014 he was one of the organizers of Mathematics Awareness Month. An article he co-authored, on the centennial of Martin Gardner, was featured in the book, The Best Writing on Mathematics 2015.

Mulcahy has an Erdös number is 2 as a result of a collaboration with Neil Calkin.

Card magic
Mulcahy is recognised as an authority on the mathematical principles and effects underlying cards tricks. From 2004 to 2014 he authored Card Colm, a column about mathematics and magic–especially card magic–for the Mathematical Association of America. Much of this work is collected in his book Mathematical Card Magic: Fifty-Two New Effects  He has appeared in Brady Haran's Numberphile web series.

Legacy of Martin Gardner
Mulcahy was a friend of longtime Scientific American columnist Martin Gardner during the last decade of Gardner's life. Mulcahy is a mainstay of Gathering for Gardner (Vice-President 2016-2020, Chair 2021-present), an organisation formed to honour the wide-ranging contributions made by the celebrated mathematician, skeptic, magician, philosopher, and writer. Usually shortened to G4G, it first met in 1993 and since 1996 meets every two years. In 2013 he created the official Martin Gardner site, and in 2013–2014 he chaired the Martin Gardner Centennial Committee. Mulcahy has been particularly active in promoting an associated series of meetings known as Celebration of Mind, also inspired by the works of Gardner. These days there are over 100 of these latter events every year, all around the world.

Irish mathematicians and mathematics
Mulcahy frequently writes about the culture and history of mathematics in Ireland. He is active in both Maths Week Ireland, the world's largest mathematics outreach program, and the Irish Mathematical Society. He is the creator and curator of the Annals of Irish Mathematics and Mathematicians, which chronicles four centuries of mathematical activity in Ireland, and has hosted monthly blogs since September 2016. This is now sponsored by Maths Week Ireland, which has produced annual Irish Mathematics Calendars since 2016.

Personal
Mulcahy is married to Vicki Powers, an algebraic geometer and election theorist. They had the same doctoral advisor at Cornell, Alex F. T. W. Rosenberg.

References

External links
 
 official web page
 bi-monthly List of Card Colm columns written for the Mathematical Association of America

Spelman College faculty
Cornell University alumni
Alumni of University College Dublin
Irish mathematicians
Mathematics writers
Mathematics popularizers
Mathematics educators
Recreational mathematicians
Historians of mathematics
20th-century Irish mathematicians
21st-century Irish  mathematicians
Irish magicians
1958 births
Living people